is a Japanese male racewalking athlete who competes in the 20 kilometres race walk. He holds a personal best of 1:18:53 hours. He represented his nation at the 2016 Summer Olympics and was the 2014 World Junior champion.

He made his first impact at the 2012 Asian Junior Athletics Championships, taking a silver, then won the 2014 World Junior Championships in Athletics in a championship record of 39:27.19 minutes. He also took a silver in the junior race behind Gao Wenkui at the 2014 IAAF World Race Walking Cup in China. Moving into the senior ranks he took bronze medals at the 2015 Asian Race Walking Championships and the 2015 Summer Universiade

He started 2016 with a win at the Asian Race Walking Championships. He was selected to represent Japan at the 2016 Summer Olympics and placed seventh in the final.

Personal bests
10,000 metres race walk – 	39:18.04 min (2015)
10 kilometres race walk – 39:45 min (2014)
20 kilometres race walk – 1:18:53 hrs (2016)

All information from All-Athletics.

International competitions

References

External links

Living people
1995 births
Japanese male racewalkers
Olympic athletes of Japan
Athletes (track and field) at the 2016 Summer Olympics
Universiade medalists in athletics (track and field)
Universiade bronze medalists for Japan
Medalists at the 2015 Summer Universiade
21st-century Japanese people